Melati may refer to
Melati (name)
Taman Melati, a township in Kuala Lumpur, Malaysia
Taman Melati LRT station
Melati untuk Marvel, Indonesian TV serial 
Melati van Agam (disambiguation)